James Arthur Heale (16 September 1914 – 22 May 1997) was an English footballer who played for Bristol City, Manchester City.

Early life
Heale attended South Street School and played in an international trial for school boys. Other clubs interested when he was transferred to Manchester City F.C., were Arsenal, Leicester City, Aston Villa F.C., Wolverhampton Wanderers, and Leeds United. Manchester City paid £3,500 for Heale in January 1934. The year of Heale's transfer was the year Manchester City won the FA Cup, but he was cup-tied, having played for Bristol City in the first round.

Manchester City

Heale joined players such as Matt Busby and Frank Swift at Manchester City F.C. Problems with his knee the season that City won the League Championship, caused him to miss out on a medal. Some tipped Heale as a future England international. A serious leg injury finished his career in 1938/1939.

Career highlights

Scoring a hat-trick against Rangers F.C.
Scoring 5 goals in a wartime match against Stockport County F.C.
Managing Manchester Police Football Team, and winning the National Police Cup title.

After retirement

Heale managed Manchester Police Football Team, and won the National Police Cup title with them. He also scouted for his Manchester City F.C.

References

1914 births
Footballers from Bristol
1997 deaths
English footballers
Association football forwards
Bristol City F.C. players
Manchester City F.C. players
Manchester City F.C. non-playing staff